National Route 916 or N916 is a , two-to-four lane road that consists of three different major streets in Davao City. It is one of major roads in the city that connects the western and eastern part of Davao.

Route description 
There are three components of this road, Quimpo Boulevard, Quezon Boulevard, Leon Garcia Street, and R. Castillo Street.

Quimpo Boulevard 

Quimpo Boulevard is a  road in Talomo district that links AH26 to Bolton Bridge. It also has an intersection near Bolton Bridge which links to a tertiary road that also serves as a shortcut to AH26.

Quezon Boulevard
Quezon Boulevard is a  road that links Bolton Bridge to Magsaysay Avenue (N919), at the vicinity of Magsaysay Park in Poblacion district.

Leon Garcia Street 
Leon Garcia Street is a  road that connects N919 to the Agdao Flyover. It also links to Santa Ana Avenue, also a part of N919, in Uyanguren.

R. Castillo Street 
R. Castillo Street is a  that connects the eastern section of N916 back to AH26. It links Agdao to Lanang.

References 

Roads in Davao del Sur
Davao City